The  was a -diameter torpedo of the Imperial Japanese Navy (IJN), launched from surface ships. It is commonly referred to as the Long Lance by most modern English-language naval historians, a nickname given to it after the war by Samuel Eliot Morison,  the chief historian of the U.S. Navy, who spent much of the war in the Pacific Theater. In Japanese references, the term  is also used, in reference to its propulsion system. It was the most advanced naval torpedo in the world at the time.

History and development 
The Type 93's development (in parallel with a submarine-launched model, the Type 95) began in Japan in 1928, under the auspices of Rear Admiral Kaneji Kishimoto and Captain Toshihide Asakuma. The torpedo design was inspired by the British oxygen-enriched torpedoes used on the s. At the time, the most powerful potential enemy of the Japanese Navy was the United States Navy's Pacific Fleet. The U.S. Navy's doctrine, presuming an invasion by Japan of the Philippines (an American commonwealth at that time), called for the battle line to fight its way across the Pacific Ocean, relieve or recapture the Philippines, and destroy the Japanese fleet. Since the IJN had fewer battleships than the U.S. Navy, it planned to use light forces (light cruisers, destroyers, and submarines) to whittle down the U.S. Navy's fleet in a succession of minor battles, mostly at night. After the number of American warships was sufficiently reduced, the IJN would commit its own presumably fresh and undamaged battleships to finish off the U.S. remnants in one huge climactic battle. (This was essentially what the U.S. Navy's "War Plan Orange" expected.)

The Japanese Navy invested heavily in developing a large, heavy, and long-range torpedo, the Type 93. Torpedoes were the only weapon that gave small warships, such as destroyers, the potential to cripple or sink battleships. The IJN's torpedo research and development focused on using highly compressed oxygen instead of compressed air as the fuel oxidizer in the torpedo's propulsion system. These torpedoes used an otherwise normal wet-heater engine burning a fuel such as Kerosene. Since air is only 21% oxygen (and 78% nitrogen), pure oxygen provides nearly five times as much oxidizer in the same tank volume, thereby increasing torpedo range. In addition, the absence of the inert nitrogen resulted in the emission of significantly less exhaust gas, comprising only carbon dioxide, which is significantly soluble in water, and water vapor, thus greatly reducing tell-tale bubble trails.

Compressed oxygen is dangerous to handle and required lengthy research and development, not to mention additional training for the warship's torpedomen, for safe operational use. Eventually, the IJN's weapons development engineers found that by starting the torpedo's engine with compressed air, and then gradually switching to pure oxygen, they were able to overcome the problem of explosions that had hampered it before. To conceal the use of pure oxygen from the ship's crew and any potential enemy, the oxygen tank was named the secondary air tank. The pure oxygen torpedo was first deployed by the IJN in 1935.

Specification 
Some specification examples of ranges by speed:
  at 
  at 
  at 

This sometimes occurred when USN cruisers chased IJN destroyers breaking away from the scene of the battle at high speed during the night, or when American fleet carriers, engaged in flight operations, were targeted by IJN submarines in the South Pacific in 1942–43.

Rear Admiral Jungo Rai explained this weapon in the chapter "Torpedo", in collective work The Full Particulars of Secret Weapons (秘密兵器の全貌), first published by Koyo-sha, Japan, in 1952.

The Type 93 torpedo had a main chamber filled with pure compressed oxygen, a joint regulator valve preventing reverse flow, and a small (approximately 13-liter) high-pressure air tank. First, compressed air was  mixed with fuel, and the mixture was supplied to a heat starter. Ignition started gently, with the mixture burning steadily in the engine (if oxygen was used at this stage, explosions were common). As the compressed air was consumed and lost pressure, high-pressure oxygen was supplied from the main chamber through the joint valve into the compressed air tank. Soon the air tank was filled with pure oxygen, and combustion continued in the engine.

The torpedo needed careful maintenance. Warships equipped with Type 93 torpedo launchers required an oxygen generator system to use this type of torpedo.

Development of Kaiten from the Type 93 

The rotational speed of the gyrocompass was increased to 20,000 rpm for the Kaiten manned torpedo.

The Kaiten had a stable slow cruising capability just beneath the surface.

Operational history
Its long range, high speed, and heavy warheads provided a formidable punch in surface battles. The Type 93 was launched from  torpedo tubes mounted on the decks of IJN destroyers and cruisers; some Japanese destroyers, unlike ships of other navies, mounted their banks of torpedo tubes in turrets offering protection against splinters, and had tube loaders. The IJN armed nearly all of its cruisers with Type 93 torpedoes.

The many torpedo hits suffered by Allied warships in such engagements led their officers to believe torpedoes had been fired by undetected Japanese submarines operating in concert with the surface warships. On rare occasions, stray Type 93s struck ships at a much longer range than their intended targets, leading the Allies on occasion to suspect their ships had been mined. The capabilities of the Type 93 went mostly unrecognized by the Allies until examples were captured intact in 1943.

A  version, the Type 97, was later developed for midget submarines, but was not a success, and was replaced operationally by Japan's standard aerial torpedo, the Type 91. A  version for use by a few IJN submarines was designated the Type 95, and it was ultimately successful.

A disadvantage of the Type 93 was that its Shimose explosive warhead was far more likely to detonate due to shock than a TNT-loaded torpedo. The explosion from one Type 93, with its heavy warhead, was usually enough to sink the destroyer, or heavily damage the cruiser, carrying it. As American air strikes against IJN ships became more common, captains of destroyers and cruisers under air attack had to decide whether or not to jettison torpedoes to prevent them from being detonated during the attack. In one instance, the heavy cruiser Chikuma jettisoned her Type 93s just before being hit by bombs from several USN dive bombers at the Battle of the Santa Cruz Islands. It was initially believed that during the Battle off Samar (in the eastern Philippines) a  shell from escort carrier USS White Plains struck the heavy cruiser Chōkai which detonated the cruiser's Type 93 torpedoes, causing damage that forced the ship to be scuttled; however the 2019 discovery by the RV Petrel of the wreck of the Chōkai with her torpedoes intact disproved this theory. The same Samar engagement saw the heavy cruiser Suzuya sunk by the detonation of her Type 93 torpedoes: a bomb near miss starboard amidships set off the torpedoes in the starboard tube mounts; the resultant fires propagated to other torpedoes nearby and beyond; the subsequent explosions damaged one of the boilers and the starboard engine rooms and eventually reached the main magazines.

Successes of the Type 93 torpedo

While the Type 93 torpedo was dangerous to its user as well as its intended target, the Imperial Japanese Navy felt that its effectiveness outweighed its risks. During the course of the war, 22 Allied warships were sunk after Type 93 hits: 10 cruisers, 11 destroyers, and one fleet aircraft carrier.  Thirteen of these had been fatally hit solely by the Type 93, with the rest succumbing to a combination of bombs, gunfire, and torpedoes.

Battle of the Java Sea:
 Dutch destroyer HNLMS Piet Hein 19 February 1942 by IJN destroyer Asashio
 Dutch cruiser HNLMS Java 27 February 1942 by IJN cruisers Haguro and Nachi
 Dutch cruiser HNLMS De Ruyter 27 February 1942 by IJN cruisers Haguro and Nachi
 Dutch destroyer HNLMS Kortenaer 27 February 1942 by IJN cruiser Haguro

 More specific: actions at Sunda Strait, entailing the hunting down of Allied stragglers by the IJN:
 British cruiser  1 March 1942 by IJN destroyer Ikazuchi
 Australian cruiser  1 March 1942 by IJN cruisers Mogami and Mikuma
 American cruiser  1 March 1942 by IJN cruisers Mogami and Mikuma

Battle of Savo Island:
 9 August 1942 by IJN cruisers Chōkai, Aoba, Kako, Kinugasa, and Furutaka:
 U.S. cruisers  and  9 August 1942

Battles of Solomons/Tassafaronga/Guadalcanal/Kolombangara/Ormoc Bay/Santa Cruz Islands/Vella Lavella:
 Destroyer  22 August 1942 by IJN destroyer Kawakaze
 Aircraft carrier  26 Oct 1942 by IJN destroyers Akigumo and Makigumo (scuttled)
 Cruiser  13 November 1942 by IJN destroyer Akatsuki
 Destroyer  13 November 1942 by IJN destroyer 
 Destroyer  13 November 1942 by IJN destroyers
 Destroyer  14 November 1942 by IJN destroyers
 Destroyer  14 November 1942 by IJN destroyers; later scuttled by 
 Cruiser  30 November 1942 by IJN destroyer Oyashio
 Destroyer  5 July 1943 by IJN destroyer Niizuki
 Cruiser  5 July 1943 by IJN destroyers Suzukaze and Tanikaze
 Destroyer  12 July 1943 by IJN destroyer
 Destroyer  6 October 1943 by IJN destroyer Yugumo
 Destroyer  3 December 1944 probably by IJN destroyer Take

Surviving examples 
Several examples are displayed in museums. This is an incomplete list:
 Imperial War Museum Duxford, England.
 Papua New Guinea National Museum, Waigani.
 USS Arizona Memorial, Pearl Harbor, Hawaii.
 U.S. Naval Academy, Annapolis, Maryland – displayed outside in small park in front of Dahlgren Hall. The torpedo flanks a pathway on the other side of which is a Type 91 Japanese air-launched torpedo.
 Yūshūkan museum, Tokyo, Japan.
 In store at Explosion Museum of Naval Firepower, part of the National Museum of the Royal Navy, Gosport, Hampshire, England
 Navy Yard, Washington D.C.
 

A number are also located within the war wrecks of Chuuk (Truk) Lagoon, specifically in the holds of the Heian Maru, San Francisco Maru and Seiko Maru.

See also 
 List of weapons of the Japanese Navy
 Torpedo
 Type 91 torpedo
 War Plan Orange
Akya Torpedo, Turkey

Notes

References

Bibliography

Further reading

External links 
 CombinedFleet info on torpedoes
 NavWeap's compilation of technical and development data

 

Torpedoes of Japan
World War II weapons of Japan
World War II naval weapons
Military equipment introduced in the 1930s